Tesla Boy is a Russian synthpop band formed in 2008 by sound producer, songwriter and musician Anton Sevidov.

History
From an early age, Anton Sevidov learned music through his father's old vinyl collection that included Ray Charles, Prince, Stevie Wonder and Blondie.

The activity of the band began from the recording and spreading online the demo consisting of five tracks, which were released as "The Tesla Boy EP" later. 
First Tesla Boy gave few concerts, but after that in 2009 Tesla Boy had their first open show. This show helped the band to become well-known, furthermore, "Valerie", a popular foreign blog about music, wrote about the band.

Mullet Records, a British record label, suggested to release a mini album with five tracks. "The Tesla Boy EP" uploaded in winter, 2009, official release was in September, and later autumn the album of remixes was dropped. The band had shows on big festivals such as Afisha’s Picnic and STEREOLETO. Moreover, Tesla Boy’s songs were rotated on radio BBC.

In 2010, Tesla Boy released a new album Modern Thrills. There was a presentation of it in club Strelka. The band was in the line-up of Afisha’s Picnic again, also Tesla Boy had a show on EXIT festival, in Serbia with Midnight Juggernauts. Then the band had their first concert tour in Barcelona, Spain. By the end of 2010, Tesla Boy had a concert in Tromsø Norway, festival Insomnia.

In 2011, Tesla Boy had their tour in Scandinavia (Sweden and Finland) and released the song "In your Eyes" under the French label Kitsuné. Therefore, the band was a special guest in the Hurts tour in Russia.

In 2012, Tesla Boy had a concert tour in New York, USA, they gave a show at Webster Hall and at Full Moon festival. In May VICE magazine presented their new single "Fantasy", and in September there was a clip for this song.

In December 2012, the band presented maxi-single "Split", which included two new songs "Another light", "Split" and remixes for "The Myriads", "Pioneerball" and "SoundSAM". Martin Dubka, an English sound producer helped Tesla Boy with the new tracks. Also at the same time, the band released their new video for a song "Split". It was directed in New York, in September 2012 by the Andrey Krauzov.

In March 2013, the single "1991" was dropped. On 21 May, Tesla Boy presented their new album "The Universe Made of Darkness". It came to the ITunes top in Russia, USA, Mexico and Europe. There were three shows in Moscow, St. Petersburg and Kyiv dedicated to the album and more than 15 thousands of fans visited those shows. Band went on tour to Mexico twice in a year and the big tour to the USA in September. In summer 2013 Tesla Boy released a new video for "Undetected" presented on website of Jay-Z. Also the band took a part in Russian tour of Cut Copy, Australian band.

In 2015 Tesla Boy released single "Nothing". By the end of the year Tesla Boy had a little concert tour in four USA towns: Los Angeles, San-Francisco, Portland and Seattle. 
The new program from the band was presented on the 20th of March in 2016 in Gogol Centre. At the same time Tesla Boy released a video for "Nothing", which was put in the SXSW (Austin, Texas) and Berlin Music Video Awards festival programs.

In summer 2016 the band dropped their new EP — "Moses" with five songs on it, and moreover, they presented a new clip "Circles" (director Ryan Patrick).

There was a premiere of the single "Compromise" from the new album "Remedy" on 7 September. Remedy was out on 19 October 2018. Remedy was created for a year and a half in various parts of the Earth: Moscow, St. Petersburg, Prague, London and Bali Island.

In April 2019, the band leaked the first Russian-language single "Holod uydet" ("Cold will go away"). The new album "Andropov" was presented on the 10 April 2020. The resource of inspiration for recording were Soviet Union’s architecture and long prospects, which are ending in uptowns, TV shows: "The New Pope", "Chernobyl" and movie "Climax".

On 5 June 2020, the band released their first live-album Remedy. It consists of five audio-tracks and six videos from Moscow presentation of "Remedy" in the GlavClub in 2018.

Discography

Studio albums
Modern Thrills (2010)
The Universe Made of Darkness (2013)
Moses (2016)
Remedy (2018)
Андропов (2020)

Singles

Music videos

Musicians
Anton Sevidov — vocal, keyboards, sound production (2008–present)
Peter Dolsky — bass, keyboards (2018–present)
Ilya Kazantsev — percussion (2018–present)
Kirill Glezin — drums (2019–present)

Dmitry Midborn – bass (2008–2012)
Konstantin Poko Cox Pokhvalin – guitar, back vocals (2010–2012)
Boris Lifshits – drums (2008–2010)
Leo Zatagin – bass (2012–2018)
Stan "Pioneerball" Astakhov – guitar, keyboards (2013–2018)
Mike Studnitsyn — drums, back vocals (2010–2019)
Igor Gribov — guitar (2018–2019)
Igor Ten — sax (2018–2019)
Roman Nochevnyy — guitar (2019)

In popular culture
Tesla Boy's song "Spirit of the Night" was featured in Forza Horizons in-game radio station "Horizon Pulse".

References

External links 
 

2008 establishments in Russia
Musical groups established in 2008
Musical groups from Moscow
Musical quartets
Russian synthpop groups